Ol-Vir is a fictional character, a supervillain in the future of the DC Comics universe. He first appeared in Legion of Super-Heroes (vol. 2) #294 (December 1982), and is often depicted as a member of the Legion of Super-Villains.

Fictional character biography
In the 30th century, the Apokoliptan tyrant Darkseid steals the abilities of Mordru and the Time Trapper, using them to enthrall the entire population of the planet Daxam. He then transports the planet to a star system with a yellow sun, giving each one of the three billion Daxamites powers equivalent to those of Superman. The enslaved Daxamites wreak havoc throughout United Planets territory, with one of them – a child named Ol-Vir – attacking the prison planet Takron-Galtos. Legion of Super-Heroes member Chameleon Boy manages to contain the child by tossing him into a cell with the monstrous Validus, one of the only beings as powerful as a Daxamite. The Legion engages Darkseid in battle, eventually causing him to lose his mental control of the Daxamites and retreat.

Sometime later, Nemesis Kid leads the Legion of Super-Villains in a coordinated assault on their heroic counterparts. Ol-Vir participates in the attack, but is defeated when Element Lad transmutes his costume into lead - a Daxamite's primary weakness.  Unlike the other Daxamites, the child still worships Darkseid as a god. He later leads Validus in an attack upon the Legion, and persuades the monster to destroy married Legionnaires Lightning Lad and Saturn Girl. During this battle, Saturn Girl realizes for the first time that Validus is actually her son, secretly stolen at birth by Darkseid. Disgusted by Ol-Vir's failure, Darkseid reduces the child to dust. Out of respect for Saturn Girl's strength of will, Darkseid restores Validus to normal.

Post-Zero Hour
Ol-Vir does not appear in the Post-Zero Hour timeline launched in 1994, nor in the so-called "Threeboot" continuity launched in 2004’s Teen Titans/Legion Special.

Post-Infinite Crisis
In the aftermath of the Infinite Crisis miniseries, most of the Legion's original continuity has been restored. In this current timeline, Ol-Vir apparently was not destroyed by Darkseid. Now an adult, he is one of the many villains who participates into a massive assault on the Legion by Superboy-Prime and the Legion of Super-Villains. He is defeated when the Earth-247 Live Wire (inhabiting the body of that world's Element Lad) transmutes the Earth-247 Ferro into lead.

Powers and abilities
Generally, the abilities of Ol-Vir (and other Daxamites) are identical to those of Superman and other natives of the planet Krypton (super-strength; speed; flight; x-ray, heat, microscopic and telescopic vision powers; invulnerability and super hearing), with two major exceptions:
 He is vulnerable to the inert element lead, instead of the radioactive element Kryptonite.
 Lead poisoning is fatal to Daxamites without regular ingestion of anti-lead serum, such as the one modified by Brainiac 5 to save the life of Mon-El. It is unclear how Ol-Vir survived the two known instances in which he was exposed to lead.

References

DC Comics aliens
DC Comics characters who can move at superhuman speeds
DC Comics characters with superhuman strength
DC Comics extraterrestrial supervillains
DC Comics supervillains
Comics characters introduced in 1982
Characters created by Keith Giffen
Characters created by Paul Levitz